Jarl ("Lali") Öhman (14 November 1891 in Helsinki – 20 January 1936 in Kokkola) was a Finnish amateur footballer who was included in the Finland football team for the 1912 Summer Olympics football event, which he appeared in all four matches, making two goals. Finland finished fourth for the main tournament.

He was the inaugural manager of the Finland national football team.

References

External links

1891 births
1936 deaths
Association football forwards
Finnish footballers
Finland international footballers
Finland national football team managers
Vaasan Palloseura players
Footballers at the 1912 Summer Olympics
Olympic footballers of Finland
Footballers from Helsinki
Finnish football managers
HIFK Fotboll players